Mara or Mrityu Devi is a Sanskrit word meaning "death" or any personification thereof. In Hinduism, Mara is the goddess of death and offerings would be placed at her altar. Though much less popular, some sects of worship do exist in India. Her counterpart in Latvian mythology is Māra.

She is an important deity worshipped by ethnic groups across South Asia, including the Kalash and once by the Nuristani peoples, indicating her prominence in ancient Hinduism.

See also
Mara (demon), a "demon" of the Buddhist cosmology

References

Hindu goddesses